Pulse is the title of the second solo album from session keyboardist Greg Phillinganes.  Released on July 17, 1984, the album included what is perhaps Phillinganes' best-known solo "hit," a cover of Japanese synthpop band Yellow Magic Orchestra's song, "Behind the Mask," with additional lyrics by Michael Jackson.  The track "Countdown to Love" was also featured in the 1984 film, Streets of Fire, while both "Playin' with Fire" and "Signals" would later appear in the 1986 film, Touch and Go. In addition, the song "Lazy Nina" was written by Donald Fagen exclusively for Phillinganes, and has never been recorded by Fagen himself. The details of the release are below.

Track listing
 "Behind the Mask" (Ryuichi Sakamoto, Chris Mosdell, Michael Jackson) (4:48) 
 "Won't Be Long Now" (Robbie Nevil, Mark Muller (sic)) (5:05)  
 "Playin' With Fire" (Jackie Jackson, Pamela Phillips-Oland, Jack Wargo) (4:46)   
 "I Have Dreamed" (Richard Rodgers, Oscar Hammerstein II) (4:39)
 "Come As You Are" (Brock Walsh, Nevil) (4:18) 
 "Lazy Nina" (Donald Fagen) (5:25)  
 "Signals" (Richard Page, John Lang, Greg Phillinganes, Nathan East) (5:00)
 "Countdown To Love" (Kenny Vance, Marty Kupersmith) (2:56)
 "Shake It" (Anthony Marinelli, Share Stallings, Brian Banks) (6:08)

Personnel
Greg Phillinganes – all lead vocals, backing vocals, and keyboards EXCEPT WHERE NOTED
Brian Banks, Anthony Marinelli – all synclavier programming, "special effects"

Additional track-by-track personnel

"Behind the Mask"
David Williams – guitars
Brian Banks and Anthony Marinelli – synthesizer programming
Michael Boddicker – vocoder
Howie Rice – clap effects
Richard Page – additional backing vocals
Rumors have circulated that Michael Jackson himself also performed some backing vocals uncredited
Arranger: Michael Jackson
Additional Engineering: John Arrias and John Vigran

"Won't Be Long Now"
Pointer Sisters – special guest (backing) vocals
Robbie Nevil – guitars
Paulinho da Costa – percussion
Brian Banks and Anthony Marinelli – synthesizer programming
Arrangers: Greg Phillinganes and Robbie Nevil

"Playin' With Fire"
James Ingram, Howard Hewett, Phillip Ingram – special guest (backing) vocals
Carlos Rios – guitar
Carlos Vega – drums
Bo Tomlyn – synthesizer programming
Jerry Hey – horns
Michael Boddicker – horn synthesizers
Arranger: Jackie Jackson
Horn Arrangements: Jackie Jackson and Jerry Hey
Engineer: John Vigran
Additional Engineering: Gary Skardina, Roger Paglia, Alex Schmoll

"I Have Dreamed"
Brian Banks and Anthony Marinelli – synthesizer programming
John Robinson – cymbals, hi-hat
Arranger: Greg Phillinganes
Additional engineering: John Vigran

"Come as You Are"
Robbie Nevil – guitar
Paulinho da Costa – percussion
Julia Tillman, Maxine Willard, and Clydene Jackson – additional backing vocals
Associate producers: Brock Walsh, Robbie Nevil
Arranger: Robbie Nevil
Track engineer: Bert Battaglia

"Lazy Nina"
Michael Boddicker – synthesizer programming
John Robinson – drums
Philip Perry, Maxi Anderson, Darryl Phinnessee, and Gwen Matthews – additional backing vocals
Greg Phillinganes, Cherron Taylor-Phillinganes, Shyra Mason, and Howard Dresden – claps
Arrangers: Donald Fagen and Greg Phillinganes
Additional engineering: Jeremy Smith and John Vigran

"Signals"
Bo Tomlyn – synthesizer programming
Nathan East – bass
Paulinho da Costa – percussion
Richard Page, Steve George – additional backing vocals
Arranger: Greg Phillinganes

"Countdown to Love"
Howie Rice – synthesizer
Greg Phillinganes – additional keyboards, synthesizer solo
Dennis Herring – guitar
Arranger: Howie Rice
Additional Engineering: John Arrias and Roger Paglia

"Shake It"
Anthony Marinelli and Brian Banks – synthesizers and synthesizer programming
Daryl Phinnessee – backing vocals and chants
Associate Producers: Anthony Marinelli, Brian Banks
Arrangers: Anthony Marinelli, Brian Banks, Greg Phillinganes
Engineers: Anthony Marinelli, Brian Banks

Production credits
Producer: Richard Perry
Recording Engineer: Michael Brooks (except where noted above)
Assistant Engineers: Greg Holguin, Bob Loftus, and Alex Schmoll
Remix Engineers: Bill Schnee, Michael Brooks, John Arrias, and Lew Hahn
Mastering: Stephen Marcussen (at Precision Lacquer)

References

1984 albums
Albums produced by Richard Perry
Planet Records albums